Fu Yubin ( born 9 August 1963) is a Chinese former football goalkeeper who spent his whole career for Liaoning where he won several Chinese league titles and the 1990 Asian Club Championship. In his international career he represented China in the 1992 Asian Cup where he aided them to a third-place finish.

Biography
Fu Yubin started his career within the 1983 Chinese league season for Liaoning and despite being relevantly short for a goalkeeper he eventually established himself within the team that went on to win the 1985 Chinese league season. This soon saw him called up to the Chinese national team where he was part of the squad that was unexpectedly knocked out by Hong-Kong in the 1986 FIFA World Cup qualification campaign. While he didn't actually play within the game the humbling experience spurred him on and he went on aid his club to be the most dominant team within the league as well helping the team win its first continental championship when they won the 1990 Asian Club Championship. He then went on to establish himself as China's first choice goalkeeper and aided them to a third-place finish after beating United Arab Emirates in a 4-3 penalty shootout. Fu retired by the end of the 1994 league season and moved away from football to join the Chinese entertainment business.

Honours
Asian Club Championship: 1990
Chinese Jia-A League: 1985, 1987, 1988, 1990, 1991, 1992, 1993
Chinese FA Cup: 1984, 1986

References

External links
Team China Stats

Sodasoccer Profile

1963 births
Living people
Chinese footballers
Footballers from Dalian
China international footballers
Liaoning F.C. players
Footballers at the 1990 Asian Games
Association football goalkeepers
Asian Games competitors for China